Benjamin Kwakye (born 7 January 1967) is a Ghanaian novelist and lawyer. His first novel, The Clothes of Nakedness, won the 1999 Commonwealth Writers' Prize, best first book, Africa, and has been adapted for radio as a BBC Play of the Week. His novel The Sun by Night won the 2006 Commonwealth Writers' Prize, Best Book Africa. His novel The Other Crucifix won the 2011 IPPY award. His is also the winner of the 2021 African Literature Association's Book of the Year Award for Creative Writing.

Kwakye was born in Accra, Ghana and attended the Presbyterian Boys' Secondary School.  He graduated from Dartmouth College and Harvard Law School.  He is the author of several works of fiction and poetry, including a trilogy of the African migrant's experiences in the US (The Other Crucifix, The Three Books of Shama and The Count's False Banquet). His impressive epic poem that spans over 400 pages has been described by Kirkus Review as an "imaginative tale" of "rhyming quatrains" that move with "wit and grace" and "contains cutting insights into human nature." He has been described as staking a claim to being incontestably in the front rank of African writers and as arguably the most important novelist to come out of Ghana since Ayi Kwei Armah.  Kwakye practices law as in-house counsel, and is a director of the African Education Initiative. In his corporate legal career, he has worked with a number of private sector firms including Porter Wright, Abbott Laboratories, Hospira, Visa Inc. and General Motors.

Works
The Clothes of Nakedness, Heinemann Books, 1998, 
The Sun by Night, Africa World Press, 2006, 
The Other Crucifix, Ayebia Publishing, 2010; Lynne Rienner Pub, 2010, 
 "Eyes of the Slain Woman", Anaphora, 2011
 Legacy of Phantoms, Africa World Press, 2015, 
 "Scrolls of the Living Night", Cissus World Press, 2015
 "The Executioner's Confession", Cissus World Press, 2015
 "The Three Books of Shama", Cissus World Press, 2016
 "The Count's False Banquet", Cissus World Press, 2017
 "Soul to Song", Cissus World Press, 2017
 "Songs of a Jealous Wind", Cissus World Press, 2018
 "Obsessions of Paradise", Cissus World Press, 2019
 "Songs of Benjamin", Cissus World Press, 2020
 "Innocence of Photographs", Cissus World Press, 2021
 "Shimmering at Sunset" (editor), Cissus World Press, 2021

References

External links
Author's website
"Poet-scholar Dike Okoro in conversation with Novelist, Benjamin Kwakye", Pencil Tribe Magazine, 9 December 2009
benjamin-kwakye/ Writers’ Showcase: Benjamin Kwakye, The African Novel, 10 November 2008
"An Interview with Ghanaian Author Benjamin Kwakye", Africa Book Club, 27 February 2011
"The Other Crucifix", African Book Club, Daniel Musiitwa, 26 January 2011
"Benjamin Kwakye – The Sun By Night", Jamati, Shirlene Alusa-Brown, 27 December 2007

Reviews
Peter W. Vakunta, "A Tale of Double Estrangement: A Review of Benjamin Kwakye’s The Other Crucifix.", Palapala Magazine, 1 February 2011
"Tiring the Naked", Obsidian, Yitah,
The Clothes of Nakedness by Benjamin Kwakye, A Review
 https://www.kirkusreviews.com/search/?sf=r&q=kwakye
https://www.kirkusreviews.com/book-reviews/benjamin-kwakye/obsessions-of-paradise/

Ghanaian novelists
Ghanaian male writers
People from Accra
Dartmouth College alumni
Harvard Law School alumni
Living people
Ghanaian emigrants to the United States
1967 births
21st-century novelists
Presbyterian Boys' Senior High School alumni